Estádio Germano Krüger, is a multi-purpose stadium in Ponta Grossa, Paraná, Brazil. Owned by Operário Ferroviário, it is currently used mostly for football matches. The stadium has a capacity of 10,632 people.

The stadium is named after Germano Krüger, a German engineer who was Operário's president and designed the stadium.

References

External links
Stadium article  at Operário.com 

Operário Ferroviário Esporte Clube
Football venues in Paraná (state)
Multi-purpose stadiums in Brazil